Thalictrum simplex is a species of flowering plant belonging to the family Ranunculaceae.

Its native range is Temperate Eurasia.

References

simplex